Christophe Bonvin (born 14 July 1965) is a former Swiss footballer who played as a midfielder.

He mostly played for FC Sion, but also for Servette and Neuchâtel Xamax. For Switzerland national football team he got 45 international caps, scored 8 goals and was in roster for Euro 1996.

Honours

Player
FC Sion
Swiss Championship: 1996–97
Swiss Cup: 1985–86, 1994–95, 1995–96, 1996–97

Neuchâtel Xamax
Swiss Super Cup: 1990

References

External links
 

1965 births
Living people
Swiss men's footballers
Association football midfielders
UEFA Euro 1996 players
Switzerland international footballers
Swiss Super League players
FC Sion players
Neuchâtel Xamax FCS players
Servette FC players
People from Sion, Switzerland
Sportspeople from Valais